The Eastern Frontier Rifles (EFR) are a State Armed Police Force for the Indian state of West Bengal. They are a part of the West Bengal Police, as opposed to the Kolkata jurisdiction.  The Border Guards Bangladesh are descended from the portion of the Eastern Frontier Rifles given to Pakistan during the partitioning of 1947.

The Eastern Frontier Rifles were founded as the "Frontier Protection Force" by the East India Company in the second half of the eighteenth century, and have held their current title since 1920. The Eastern Frontier Rifles fought in the First World War (as the Bengal Military Police) and also in the Second World War.

When India and Pakistan became independent in 1947, the force was split between West Bengal and Pakistan and the Pakistani part became the East Pakistan Rifles. When in turn East Pakistan (now Bangladesh) became independent, it was called Bangladesh Rifles, and recently in 2010, it was renamed Border Guards Bangladesh. The West Bengal (i.e. Indian) part of the force, however, retained the original name of Eastern Frontier Rifles.

History
18th century: Founded as Frontier Protection Force.
1795: Renamed Ramgarh Local Battalion.
1861: Renamed Frontier Guards.
1891: Renamed Bengal Military Police, modernised, and given up-to-date weaponry. An unrelated unit, the 45th Sikhs, had previously used this same title.
1920: Re-organised and renamed Eastern Frontier Rifles.
1947: Split between the Indian state of West Bengal and Pakistan. The former retained the unit's original title.

Past and present
On 1 February 1910, the Silchar and Garo Hills Battalions were amalgamated with Dacca Battalion. Subsequently, in the same year, a detachment of 100 men was raised at Barisal and a full-fledged battalion with the strength of one Commandant, 4 Assistant Commandants, 8 Subedars, 8 Jamadars, 66 Havildars, and 664 Sepoys and Buglers was created at Dacca Headquarters, with detachments at Tura, Silchar and Barisal. In 1911, the battalion participated for the first time in military operations in the Mishmi Mission. In November 1911, a battalion school headquarters with a staff of a single full-time teacher was sanctioned and started functioning. Owing to the repartition of Eastern Bengal and Assam, consequent upon the Delhi Darbar announcement in 1912, many changes took place in the battalion. The Silchar and Garo Hills detachment were transferred to the Assam Government with effect from 1 November of the same year. As a result, the battalion was decreased and it became First Bengal Military Police Battalion. The composition of the force then consisted of 1 Commandant, 2 Assistant Commandants, 1 Subedar Major, 3 Subedars, 4 Jamadars, 39 Havildars and 664 Sepoys and Buglers.

In early 1912, this battalion received the commendation of the local government for the excellent and arduous duties performed in guarding extremist prisoners. The Mishmi mission detachment returned at the end of February 1912, again with a commendation from His Majesty's Imperial Government for their excellent work. In January of the same year, the Viceroy Lord Hardinge complimented the battalion and mounted escort for their smartness and remarked on the quality of the playing band. Mr. Hughes Buller, Inspector-General of Police, also put a complimentary notice in the "Police Gazette". Later that year, Guards of Honour were presented by the Battalion to the Governor of Bengal, Lord Carmichael. The battalion was also inspected by him on 16 July, who made the following remark: "I was much struck by their smart and soldiery appearance. They were physically cleaned and well turned out and looked a well drilled lot of men."

In January 1913, on the orders of the Bengal Inspector-General of Police, a detachment of the battalion was sent to Naga Hills on an expedition. In the advance on Chenglong on 5 February the baggage guard was attacked. As a result, three sepoys of the Battalion were killed and three others seriously injured. Congratulatory messages were received from Lord Carmichael and Mr. Hughes Buller regarding the part the battalion had played in the fighting during the capture of Chenglong. Major-General E.S. May wrote to the Inspector-General of Police with regard to the work of the battalion during the Dacca concentration:
"The Battalion took part with the regular troops on all the combined field days. They marched well and were active and keen and their energy did not flag at the end of any of our long days in the field. Their training seemed to me to be good and efficient and carried out on the right lines. Under all circumstances the conduct of the men was excellent and they acquitted themselves in a disciplined soldier like manner. Service in the Lushai Expedition in 1888-1889 and in several minor expeditions since that date and now you have remained on the beyond the usual term, because your help was needed. Your superior officers speak in the highest terms of the work you have done during the changes which took place recently in the Dacca Military Police Battalion and your services were invaluable in raising the now coys. In 1914. You have the past received Honors, you were chosen to go to Darbar at Delhi in 1903 and again in 1911. The title of Sardar Bahadur has conferred on you and now, as I have said, it gives me great pleasure to."

Two detachment camps were set up at Buxadar and Hoogly in 1914 with two new companies commissioned by the Secretary of the State for India. The Battalion force was detailed for Law and Order duty in connection with the Komaghata Maru Sikhs Riots at Howrah and did excellent work in rounding up the rioters, and earning the thanks of the Governments of Punjab and Bengal.

At the Police parade held at Dacca on 8 August, Subedar Major Gopal Chandra, Sardar Bahadur, was decorated with the insignia of the Order of the British India, 1st class, by Lord Ronald Shay, Governor of Bengal, who in decorating him made the following remarks:
"It gives me great pleasure to decorate you with the Insignia of the Order of British India. 1st Class. In your case the service has extended over a period of nearly 40 years and for over 30 years out of the long term you have held the King's Commission, you have seen active decorate you with the Insignia of the Order of British India."

A report of the Police Administration in the Bengal Presidency stated:
"Good accounts have been received of the contingent serving with the Mesopotamia Expedition force where a Lance Naik Poli Ram has recently had been awarded the I.O.M. The Bengal Military Police furnished reinforcements for the regular Army at that time of National emergency. The officer and men so lent to the Army have been conspicuous for their soldierly gallant conduct in the field and their behaviour while serving in the regular army troops in the field has left nothing to be desired."

The Bengal Military Police won its present name "Eastern Frontier Rifles" from the Government of India in 1920, in appreciation for war services rendered. The Eastern Frontier Rifles (Bengal Battalion) Act was passed the same year and the Eastern Frontier Rifles (Bengal Battalion) Regulations issued in 1922. In 1921 the Battalion was recognized on the Platoon System, while in 1923 it was given web equipment. Notably, some detachments proceeded to Chittagaon in 1930 as a result of the Armory Raid. On 22 April they engaged the Raiders;12 persons were killed and 29 police muskets and 2000 rounds of ammunition and many empty cases were recovered. Four of them were killed and two captured while six revolvers were recovered. The District Magistrate, Mymensingh, wrote to the Government of Bengal, saying that: "Eastern Frontier Rifles have been invaluable as usual. The mere fact of their presence is a valuable asset to District Authorities."

In 1937, the approved strength of the battalion was 1 Commandant, 3 Assistant Commandants, 8 Subedars, 8 Jamadars, 70 Havildars, and 753 other ranks. In 1938, a detachment of one platoon proceeded to Rampore state in Orissa on special duty. The battalion continued to impress the authorities with their services in controlling communal riots, suppressing violent hostiles and extremists, guarding dangerous prisoners in peacetime, and fighting shoulder to shoulder with the Indian Army during the wars. The battalion also became renowned for its impressive ceremonial parades and was given the privilege of furnishing guards of honour, house guards and escorts to Viceroys and other dignitaries. In December 1941, a St. Johns Ambulance Division was formed in the battalion for the first time. This battalion was shifted from Dacca to Hijli on 1 September 1947. On 14 July 1951 it was relocated from Hijli to Salua in the district of Midnapur where the Eastern Frontier Rifles are stationed to date.

Post-independence, the Eastern Frontier Rifles continued with their tradition of loyalty, sincerity and gallantry, effectively participating in various operations. They were deployed whenever serious communal riots broke out and when the Civil Police found itself unable to suppress violent elements defying the authority of the state and endangering lives and property. Before 1956 the duties performed by the Eastern Frontier Rifles Battalion were in connection with the communal troubles and border skirmishes within the state of West Bengal. In 1956 the Battalion was deputed to Manipur and the Naga Hills for suppression of the Naga insurgency. The government was reluctant to deploy the Army for various reason at the initial stages; on the other hand, they wanted a strong police action in the area. Eventually the Eastern Frontier Rifles was attached to the 11th Indian Army, when the Army moved in. The force performed their duties with commendable courage, devotion and fortitude under very difficult circumstances. The EFR suffered 4 casualties, and when in 1961 the Indian Army moved in, they were withdrawn.

Beside their deployment to the Naga Hills, the Eastern Frontier Rifles had performed as border security duties as well. Most of the border with East Pakistan (now Bangladesh) was unmanned and therefore porous. Border rules and regulations were also constantly under review and thus there were occasional boundary skirmishes. In 1950, in Dhatupara in Nadia District, there was encounter with the Pakistan Force. The exchange of fire continued for about a week, with casualties on both sides. EFR lost 1 Naik and 1 rifleman. With the taking over of the border by the Border Security Force, the Eastern Frontier Rifles was withdrawn from the Indo-Pak Border. In 1962, when India's border skirmishes with China developed into a war, the question of internal security came to the fore and once again attention went towards the Eastern Frontier Rifles and the 2nd Battalion, which is also stationed in Salua, was deployed to keep the peace in the state. In June 1982, the services of four companies of EFR battalions were placed at the disposal of the Bihar Government to remain as a Reserve Force during the General Assembly Election of Bihar.

Awards and honours
On 15 October 1911 Subedar Major Gopal Chandra with two havildars and ten sepoys attended the Delhi Darbar to receive medals. 20 Abor Medals were given to the men who had been engaged in operations under the command of Major General Bower. Subedar Major Gopal Chandra Kharag Singh received the Order of the British India conferred on him in December 1912 and in the same year Subedar Kharag Singh received the King's Police Medal for long and meritorious service.

In 1914, in recognition of good work done in the Naga Hills expeditions, the King's Police Medal was awarded to Captain E.D. Dallas Smith, Lance Naik Mohan Chandra, Sepoy Dhanjoi Ram and Havildar Dhaga Ram.

In 1917, Lance Naik Pholi Ram was awarded I.O.M. Second Class while serving in the Indian Army at Mesopotamia. Owing to the excellent work done by Shri P.C. Dutta, Head Clerk, EFR Battalion, in the interest of the battalion since it was formed and on the recommendation of the Commandant, the title of "Raisaheb" was conferred on him in the Birthday Honours List 1922. Subedar Major Daga Ram Kachari was made a "Sardar Bahadur" in January 1925, for his good services. Sardar Bahadur Subedar Major Ganesh Bahadur Chhetri was made a member of the Order of the British Empire in the Birthday Honours List 1931. In 1939, the title of "Sardar Bahadur" was conferred on Subedar Major Bistu Ram in the New Years Honours List. Major Weleb, Assistant Commandant, and Subedar Harka Bahadur Lama received the Indian Police Medal in 1939.

The Indian Police Medal was also awarded to the following personnel after independence:
 Subedar Major Ran. Bah. Subba for Meritorious Service in 1959.
 Subedar Major Dwip Bahadur Chhetri for Meritorious Service.
 Subedar Rama Kanta Kachari — Gallantry Medal in 1950.
 Subedar Ashutosh Kachari for Meritorious Service in 1965.
 Subedar Sukman Thapa for Meritorious Service in 1969.
 Late Rifleman Til Bahadur Tamang — Gallantry Medal in 1976.
 Late Lance Naik Bhaktah Bahadur Rai — Gallantry Medal in 1976.
 Subedar Major Tikendra Ch. Kachari — Meritorious Services in 1981.

The Eastern Frontier Rifles Band
Although buglers were appointed in 1907 in the Dacca Battalion of the Eastern Bengal and Assam Military Police, which was later renamed EFR Battalion, they did form a part of the Band Party. In 1920, 20 gorkhas were discharged sepoys of Gurkha Regiments were recruited for the band and one as bugler. In 1909, 6 gorkhas were enlisted for the band and one as a bugler. In 1912, this battalion received a set of six bagpipes from Charles Bayley, Lieutenant-Governor of Eastern Bengal and Assam in recognition of their excellent services.

The band of the EFR 1st Battalion is known as the State band of the West Bengal Government. Its splendid performances during combined Police parades, Republic Day parades, state functions at Raj Bhavan and visits of foreign dignitaries like the Emperor of Ethiopia, Prime Ministers of the People's Republic of China, Poland, Romanian People's Republic, Argentina, Queen Elizabeth II, King of Nepal, President of Indonesia and others were appreciated by all who were present at those occasions. Whenever any state function is held in West Bengal, the services of this band party are requested to add colour to the occasion.

Ex. Sub. Surbir Gurung of this battalion represented West Bengal in the All India Championship Shooting Competition in 1958 and National Championship Shooting Competition in 1959 held at Calcutta, New Delhi and Bangalore, respectively and won 1st and 2nd prizes. In sports, EFR personnel are always to be reckoned with: Sub. Major Tiken Ram Kachari and Naik/Sub. Saban Ram Kachari of this battalion are well known figures in hockey who attained national prominence. Naik Bachpan Lohar and Rifleman Anil Rava of the 1st Battalion represented West Bengal for the Agha Khan Gold Cup in 1977. Shri Bir Bahadur Chhetri who represented India in the Olympic hockey tournament in 1976 and 1980 at Montreal and Moscow, respectively, was Lance Naik of this battalion.

Occasional cultural functions with traditional dances and music are organised in the battalion for the recreation of the Eastern Frontier Rifles personnel and their family members.

Extra-curricular activities
Important tactical training courses are being organised in the battalion. Recently tactical cum security training courses were conducted at the battalion for about 100 officers and men from the Rank of Dy.S.Ps to Havildars. The Eastern Frontier Rifles battalions have a number of crack shots. As a result, almost every year the battalions become champions in shooting competitions, whether in the Brigade or in the State. In 1981 and 1982 this battalion also won the H.N. Gupta Memorial Challenge Cup as the best team in inter-district and inter-unit revolver shooting competitions among police teams in West Bengal.

At present still in Salua unlike armed police forces of most states, the EFR is currently challenged with the Naxalite insurgency. In February 2010 an EFR camp called Silda was attacked and burnt down by Maoist rebels, resulting in the loss of 24 riflemen out of a detachment of about fifty. This resulted in condemnation of the state government by the EFR Special Inspector General, Benoy Chakraborty, who claimed his force was "miss-used" and "ill-treated". Morale in the force is believed to be low. The Eastern Frontier Rifles continues to be prized possession. In 1984, a new battalion was inaugurated to boost the strength and pride of the EFR. It is now located in Salua with the mother battalion.

References

Government of West Bengal
Law enforcement agencies of India